Virtua Tennis 3 (Sega Professional Tennis: Power Smash 3 in Japan) is the second arcade game sequel to Sega's tennis game franchise, Virtua Tennis. The arcade version of Virtua Tennis 3 is powered by the PC-based Sega Lindbergh arcade system board. Ports for the PC, Xbox 360, PlayStation Portable and PlayStation 3 consoles are also available with a traditional collection of tennis minigames that the home versions of Virtua Tennis are known for. In 2009, Sega updated and re-created Virtua Tennis 3 in Virtua Tennis 2009.

Console versions
Besides having Tournament Mode and Exhibition Mode from the arcade version, the home versions include a World Tour Mode and Court Games mode. These game modes replace the Challenge Mode that was present in the arcade version.

The Xbox 360 version has exclusive Xbox Live online tournaments and modes, whilst the PlayStation 3 version incorporates the option to control the game using the Sixaxis motion-sensitive controller.

Both the 360 and PS3 versions offer native 1080p support.

Game modes

World Tour
This is the main mode of the game. In this mode, the user creates a tennis player (male or female), and enters the SPT World Tour with a ranking position of 300th, and with the goal of becoming the number 1. The player needs to improve his ranking by winning matches and tournaments, as well as his abilities by successfully completing training minigames and academy exercises. This mode also allows the player to interact with the featured professional tennis players.

Tournament
This mode is similar to the arcade version of the game. The user can select either a featured professional player or one of his created players (from the World Tour mode), and must win 5 matches in different surfaces and venues to win the tournament. If the player performs well enough and gets a very good rank (A), he is challenged by Duke, one of the game's bosses. However, if the player performs well in the tournament but achieves a mediocre rank (D), he is challenged by King instead.

Exhibition
This mode allows the user to play single matches with customized options, such as the player, the opponent and the court.

Court Games
This mode features the minigames from the World Tour mode and is dedicated to multiplayer gaming.

Game Content

Playable Characters

  Roger Federer
  Rafael Nadal
  Tim Henman
  James Blake
  Mario Ancic
  Juan Carlos Ferrero

  Andy Roddick
  David Nalbandian
  Tommy Haas
  Lleyton Hewitt
  Taylor Dent
  Sebastian Grosjean

Reception
Arcade version
Arcade Belgium 19/20

PS3 version
IGN 7.8/10
GameBrink 78/100
Electronic Gaming Monthly 7.33/10
Play UK 90/100
Edge 8/10(UK)
PSM3 85/100
Pelit 88/100(Finland)
Pure Magazine 9/10(UK)
Official UK PlayStation Magazine 8/10
GameSpot 8.2/10

Xbox 360 version
IGN 8.0/10
Electronic Gaming Monthly 7.33/10
360 Gamer Magazine 9/10(UK)
Official Xbox Magazine 9/10(UK)
Eurogamer 9/10(UK)
GameTrailers 8.4/10

The average scores on GameRankings are 81% for the PlayStation 3, 80% for the Xbox 360, and 79% for PC and PlayStation Portable. On Metacritic both PlayStation 3 and PSP versions got 79% while Xbox 360 got 80%.

References

External links
North American website
Japanese website

2006 video games
Arcade video games
PlayStation 3 games
PlayStation Portable games
Sega arcade games
Sega-AM3 games
Tennis video games
Video games developed in Japan
Video games developed in the United Kingdom
Video games set in Argentina
Video games set in Australia
Video games set in China
Video games set in the Czech Republic
Video games set in Germany
Video games set in Italy
Video games set in London
Video games set in Los Angeles
Video games set in New York City
Video games set in Paris
Video games set in Russia
Video games set in San Francisco
Video games set in South Africa
Video games set in Thailand
Video games set in Tokyo
Video games set in the United Arab Emirates
Video games set in Vancouver
Virtua Tennis
Windows games
Xbox 360 games
Sumo Digital games